Iriarte is a surname. Notable people with the surname include:

 Ignacio de Iriarte (1620–1685), Spanish painter 
 Tomás de Iriarte y Oropesa (1750–1791) Spanish poet 
 Alfredo Iriarte (1932–2002), Colombian historian and writer
 Frédéric Iriarte (born 1963), French painter
 Joe Iriarte (born 1986), Investment Banker

See also
 Charles Yriarte (1832–1898), French writer
 Estación Iriarte, an area in General Pinto Partido in Buenos Aires Province